Elmore County is a county located in the east-central portion of the U.S. state of Alabama. Throughout its history, there have been many lynchings in the county including on July 2, 1901, when a local mob lynched Robert (or perhaps Robin) White. In a strange turn of events, a local farmer, George White confessed in court to the killing and named five other local men as killers. Three men were convicted in the killing and sentenced to ten years in prison. On 9 June 1902, they were pardoned by Governor Jelks.

Lynching is an extrajudicial killing by a group. In the Jim Crow American South, it was also used as an extreme form of informal group social control, and it is often conducted with the display of a public spectacle (often in the form of hanging) for maximum intimidation. Victims often professed their innocence right up to the public deaths in front of crowds that sometimes numbered in the thousands. Lynching victims are never given their time in court to prove their innonence.

Lynching in Elmore County, Alabama

National memorial 

The National Memorial for Peace and Justice opened in Montgomery, Alabama, on April 26, 2018. Featured among other things is the Memorial Corridor which displays 805 hanging steel rectangles, each representing the counties in the United States where a documented lynching took place and, for each county, the names of those lynched. The memorial hopes that communities, like Elmore County where these people were lynched, will take these slabs and install them in their own communities.

See also
List of lynching victims in the United States
List of Lynchings in 1922 Texas

Bibliography 
Notes

References 

Elmore County, Alabama
Elmore
African-American history of Alabama
Protest-related deaths
Racially motivated violence against African Americans
Riots and civil disorder in Alabama
White American riots in the United States